The Illinois State Police (ISP) is the state police agency of the state of Illinois. The Illinois State Police is responsible for traffic safety on more than 300,000 miles of total roadway, including 2,185 miles of Interstate Highways and 15,969 miles of State Highways. In 2021, the ISP Division of Patrol handled more than 48,000 traffic crashes, conducted more than 68,000 motor carrier safety inspections, and made more than 4,500 DUI arrest. The Division of Criminal Investigation opened 930 violent crime cases, opened 124 homicide cases, seized 1,590 firearms, handled 64 public integrity cases, and ensured 595 Firearm Owner Identification (FOID) card holders were in compliance. Currently, almost 3,000 sworn and civilian personnel make up the Illinois State Police.

Illinois State Police Centennial 
In 2022, to celebrate 100 years, ISP hosted several special events including a flag uncasing ceremony, gala, and proclamation signing.  ISP’s honor guard presented the colors at numerous sporting events across the state including a presentation at a Chicago Cubs home game at Wrigley Field. ISP also procured 22 limited edition patrol cars with vintage decal packages.

Troops & Organization

Organization 
The Illinois State Police is currently organized into several divisions, commands, offices and bureaus:
 Office of the Director:
 First Deputy Director
 Chief of Staff
 Office of Equal Employment Opportunity
 Office of Finance
 Office of Human Resources
 Office and Inspection & Audits
 Office of Labor Relations and Special Projects
 Legal Office
 Deputy Chief of Staff for Special Counsels Major Case Counsel
 Firearms Safety Office Counsel
 Deputy Chief of Staff for External Affairs Senior Public Safety Policy Advisor
 Office of Governmental Affairs
 Executive Office
 Public Information Office
 Deputy Chief of Staff Office of Operational & Strategic Planning
 Executive Protection Unit
 Office of Strategic Planning & Special Projects
 Office of Research & Development

 Division of Justice Services (Colonel):
 Administrative Support Command
 Logistics
 Department of Innovation and Technology
 Criminal Justice Services Command
 Bureau of Identification
 Program Administration Bureau
 Public Safety services Command
 Firearms Services Bureau
 Regulatory Services Bureau
 Division of Forensic Services (Deputy Director):
 Chief of Staff
 Fiscal Administrator
 Personnel Administrator
 Case File Administrator (FOIA)
 Assistant Deputy Director
 Forensic Sciences Command
 Crime Scene & Evidence Services Command
 Quality Assurance
 Division of Internal Investigation (Deputy Director):
 Administrative Services Command
 Background Investigations Unit
 Identified Offender Program
 Northern Command
 Southern Command
 Division of Patrol (Colonel):
 Patrol Operations Command
 North Central Patrol Command
 Troops 1, 2, 4, 5, 6
 Chicago Patrol Command
 Troops 3,15
 Southern Patrol Command
 Troops 7, 8, 9, 10
 Strategic Operations Command
 Support Servies Command
 Special Operations
 SAVE
 H.I.T.
 Support Services
 Criminal Patrol
 Motorcycle Enforcement Bureau
 Vehicle Investigations Coordinator
 Commercial Vehicle Section
 Crowd Control
 Administrative Support
 Protective Service Unit
 Division of Criminal Investigation (Colonel):
 Investigative Command
 Research & Development
 Northern Major
 Zones 1, 2, 3
 Central Major
 Zones 4, 5
 Southern Major
Zones 6, 7, 8
Support Command
 Special Operations Command/Air Operations
 Medical Fraud Bureau
 Investigative Support Command
 Intelligence Command
 Special Investigation Unit
 Statewide Gaming Command
 Chief of Staff
 Deputy Chief of Staff
 Statewide Investigative Training Special Projects Coordinator
 Division of the Academy and Training (Colonel):
 Staff/Special Projects Officer
 Honor Guard
 Trumpet Team
 Pipes & Drum Team
 Academy Commander
 Physical Skills Bureau
 Recruitment and Substance Testing Bureau
 Logistics Bureau
 Training Development Bureau
 Division Statewide 911 (Colonel):
 Statewide 911 Administrator
 Assistant Deputy Director
 Statewide 911 Bureau
 Telecommunications Services Bureau
 Radio Network Services Bureau
 Fleet Services Bureau

Troops 
The Illinois State Police reorganized from Districts into Troops, which went into effect on January 1, 2023:

Traffic enforcement
Illinois State Police currently use various methods for speed limit enforcement on Illinois highways. Hand-held and moving RADAR, LIDAR, pacing, air speed utilizing the ISP fleet of aircraft, and time-distance measurement. ISP uses typical marked units (Ford Explorer, Expedition, and Taurus, Chevrolet Caprice) as well as unmarked units. Since 2006, photo radar mounted in vans have been used for speed enforcement in construction zones statewide. Though the vans are manned by ISP officers, Conduent, a private company, provides the vans for a fee.

ISP has four Cessna 182 airplanes used for law enforcement efforts throughout the state. Three of the four aircraft are equipped with forward looking infrared cameras. All pilots assigned to the Air Operations Bureau began their career at ISP as Troopers.  ISP pilots respond to calls for service 24/7 and at no cost to the user agency.  Routine calls for service include but are not limited to missing persons searches, criminal manhunts, surveillance, pursuits, photo/video needs, civil unrest, patrol support, and transportation. Since 1959, ISP has also used aircraft for speed enforcement, using stopwatch time measurement.

Illinois State Police Merit Board
The Illinois State Police Merit Board (Merit Board) administers certification for the appointment and promotion of state police officers, as well as their discipline, removal, demotion, and suspension measures. The Merit Board consists of five civilian members appointed by the governor with the advice and consent of the State Senate. Each member serves a six-year term and no more than three members may be affiliated with the same political party.

List of ISP superintendents and directors

Superintendents

Directors

Fallen Troopers
Since the establishment of the Illinois State Police, 67 troopers have died while on duty.

Uniform and Sidearm

The ISP uniform has a distinct look that separate it from its neighbors. Instead of a chocolate brown uniform worn by the Iowa State Patrol, or a light blue on dark blue uniform worn by the Missouri State Highway Patrol, ISP officers wear light tan/khaki shirts, and dark green pants with black trim. Dress uniforms include a jacket that matches the pants. The cold weather gear incorporates a brown, all-weather jacket. Leather duty gear consists of black high gloss clarino holsters, belts, and accessories. ISP officers wear a dark brown campaign hat called a Montana Peak.

The badge, instead of a traditional shield surmounted by an eagle design, is a six-pointed star that reads the rank of the trooper, and the words "Illinois State Police" in black, along with the officer's badge number (beginning in 2002). The badge's sequential inventory number is found stamped on the reverse side of the badge. The badges are silver or chrome plated steel for all ranks below Sergeant, and gold plated for Sergeant and above.

Officers are issued a Glock 22, .40 caliber.

Rank insignia

ISP awards, commendations, citations and medals 

 Medal for Valor - ISP personnel who clearly perform an act of EXCEPTIONAL BRAVERY, with an awareness of the possibility the act could result in great bodily harm or death to themselves.
 Medal of Honor - ISP personnel who clearly accomplish with distinction a heroic act that by its nature results in saving a life, preventing a serious crime, or apprehending a person who committed a serious crime.
 Achievement Medal - ISP personnel performing an outstanding act, or acts, that results in improved administration or operation, substantial savings in labor or operational costs, greatly enhances the mission of ISP, or brings great credit to the Department. The act, or acts, must be because of performance beyond the requirements of the normal work assignment.
 Purple Heart - ISP personnel who, while in the performance of their duties, are seriously injured or killed while encountering deadly force or “other actions” causing serious, life threatening injuries or death.  II.D.2. The eligible duties do not include accidental or reckless behavior by the officer.
 Lifesaving Medal - ISP personnel who perform actions or who apply techniques that result in saving or sustaining a human life.
 Meritorious Service Medal - ISP personnel who have clearly made outstanding achievements contributing to the efficiency and/or effectiveness of the Department by consistently performing their duties with outstanding skill, diligence, productivity, judgment, and responsibility.  II.F.2. These achievements must be beyond the requirements of the normal work assignment.
 Officer of the Year - Any Trooper, Trooper First Class, Master Trooper, Senior Master Trooper, Special Agent, Senior Agent, Inspector, Senior Inspector, or Sergeant who has demonstrated outstanding skill, ability, and professionalism in the performance of his or her duties. II.M.1. A maximum of one officer from each district and zone may be considered along with a maximum of one nomination from each division and command.  II.M.2. It is not mandatory for each work location to submit a nomination.  II.M.3. Recipients of the ISP Officer of the Year will be ineligible to receive the award the following year.
 Department Commendation - ISP personnel who perform an outstanding police act with diligence, perseverance, or exceptional ability that notably contributes to enhancing the image of the Department, or prepares, directs, or executes a plan, program, or procedure that makes a notable contribution to the efficiency and/or effectiveness of the Department.
 Department Unit Citation - ISP personnel and other individuals from outside the Department who function as a unit and who have exhibited exceptional professional skill and conduct during a coordinated action or who have displayed consistent excellence in carrying out the unit's mission.
 Problem Solving Ribbon - ISP personnel who demonstrate leadership in solving a problem within the Department, in the community, or statewide, in a manner that brought great credit to the Department. II.J.2. The act or acts must be performed beyond the requirements of the normal work assignment.
 Department Service Ribbon - ISP personnel who served honorably, with distinction, during special details or assignments.
 Certificate of Recognition - ISP personnel and individuals outside the ISP who have exhibited exceptional effort and have significantly contributed to the operation of the Department.

See also

Illinois State Police:
 Illinois State Police Office (Pontiac)
 FOID (firearms)
 Illinois v. Caballes
General:
 List of law enforcement agencies in Illinois
 State police
 Highway patrol

Bibliography

References

External links
 
 Title 20, Chapter II: Department of State Police in the Illinois Administrative Code

State law enforcement agencies of Illinois
1922 establishments in Illinois
Government agencies established in 1922